is a 1960 Japanese film directed by Hiromichi Horikawa. The film is about a former leftist activist Yashuhiko Kuroki (Tatsuya Nakadai) who becomes a right wing opportunist by betraying his co-workers and friends during a strike.

Release
The Blue Beast was distributed in Japan by Toho on 26 June 1960. The film was released in the United States by Toho International with English subtitles on January 29, 1965.

Reception
"Robe." of Variety described the film as a Japanese variation of A Room at the Top. The review praised Nakadai in the role while noting "impressive performances" by Yoko Tsukasa and Keiko Awaji and Koreya Senda.

Footnotes

References

External links
 

Toho films
1960s Japanese films